X. princeps may refer to:
 Xerus princeps, the mountain ground squirrel, the Kaoko ground squirrel or the Damara ground squirrel, a rodent species native to southwestern Angola, western Namibia and western South Africa
 Xylobolus princeps, a fungus species in the genus Xylobolus